Thalassophilus is a genus of beetles in the family Carabidae, containing the following species:

 Thalassophilus azoricus Oromi & Borges, 1991
 Thalassophilus breuili Jeannel, 1926
 Thalassophilus caecus Jeannel, 1938
 Thalassophilus longicornis Sturm, 1825
 Thalassophilus pieperi Erbar, 1990
 Thalassophilus subterraneus Machado, 1989
 Thalassophilus whitei Wollaston, 1854

References

Trechinae